The wildflowers of the Sonoran Desert typically appear after a rain, some after the winter rains, and some after the summer "monsoons."

Amsinckia menziesii
 Common name: common fiddleneck
 Flowers bloom March through May

Anemone tuberosa
 Common name: desert anemone
 Flowers bloom February to April

Bahia absinthifolia
 Common name: hairyseed bahia, silverleaf bahia
 Flowers bloom spring through fall

Brickellia coulteri
 Common name: Coulter's brickellbush
 Flowers bloom March to November

Carlowrightia arizonica
 Common name: Arizona wrightwort
 Flowers bloom in the spring

Centaurium calycosum
 Common name: Arizona centaury
 Flowers bloom April to June

Cryptantha albida
 Common name: New Mexico catseye, New Mexico cryptantha
 Flowers bloom in early spring

Cryptantha angustifolia
 Common name: Panamint catseye, bristlelobe cryptantha
 Flowers bloom in early spring

Daucus pusillus
 Common name: American wild carrot
 Flowers bloom March to May

Datura innoxia
 Common name: pricklyburr

Dipterostemon capitatus
 Common name: bluedicks
 Flowers bloom February to May

Encelia farinosa
 Common name: brittlebush
 Flowers bloom in the spring

Eriophyllum lanosum
Common name: white woolly daisy
 Flowers bloom February through May

Galium aparine
 Common name: common bedstraw, cleavers, stickywilly
 Flowers bloom in the spring

Geraea canescens
 Common name: desert sunflower, hairy desert sunflower, desert gold

Glandularia gooddingii
 Common name: Gooding's verbena, southwestern mock vervain
 Flowers bloom winter, spring, and fall

Haplophyton crooksii
 Common name:  cockroachplant
 Flowers bloom March to April and July to November

Isocoma tenuisecta
 Common name: burroweed, shrine jimmyweed, burrow goldenweed
 Flowers bloom in September through November

Justicia californica
 Common name: beloperone, chuparosa
 Flowers bloom in the spring

Machaeranthera gracilis
 Common name: slender goldenweed, yellow spiny daisy
 Flowers bloom February to December

Malacothrix californica
 Common name: California desertdandelion

Marina parryi
 Common name: Parry's false prairie-clover

Melampodium leucanthum
 Common name: plains blackfoot, blackfoot daisy
 Flowers bloom March through December

Monoptilon bellioides
 Common name: Mojave desert star

Nama demissum
 Common name: purplemat
 Flowers bloom from February to May

Nicotiana obtusifolia
 Common name: desert tobacco, coyote tobacco
 Flowers bloom spring to fall

Penstemon parryi
 Common name: Parry's penstemon
 Flowers bloom February to April

Physaria purpurea
 Common name: rose bladderpod
 Flowers bloom January to May

Proboscidea parviflora
 Common name: doubleclaw

Rafinesquia neomexicana
 Common name: desert chicory, New Mexico plumeseed
 Flowers bloom mid-February to May

Salvia columbariae
 Common name: chia
 Flowers bloom March–May

Senna covesii
 Common name: Coues' senna
 Flowers bloom in spring and fall

Senna wislizeni
 Common name: Wislizenus' senna, shrubby senna 
 Flowers bloom in the mid to late summer

Silene antirrhina
 Common name: sleepy catchfly, sleepy silene
 Flowers bloom March to August

Sphaeralcea ambigua
 Common name: desert globemallow, apricot mallow
 Flowers bloom in the spring

Trixis californica
 Common name: American threefold
 Flowers after rains, most commonly in the spring

See also

 List of flora of the Sonoran Desert Region by common name
 Index: Flora of the Sonoran Deserts
 List of southern LCRV flora by region — Lower Colorado River Valley.

References

 Arizona—Sonora Desert Museum: Flora of the Sonoran Desert Region
 U.S. Wildflowers Reference List: Arizona — Reference List of websites for Arizona Wildflower Identification. 
 Pima Community College.  Common Wildflowers of Tucson.
 Floras - Arizona Native Plant Society
 USDA Plants Database — plant profiles search engine, by common or botanical names, or by U.S. state.

External links
Arizona—Sonora Desert Museum: Desert Wildflower Blooms — homepage, with focus article links.
Arizona—Sonora Desert Museum: The Desert in Bloom
Sonoran Desert Florilegium Program — homepage: botanical illustrations.
Desert USA: Desert Wildflower Field Guide — Wildflower pictures sorted by Color.

 02
Sonoran
Sonoran wildflowers
Sonoran wildflowers
Sonoran